Damodar (Sanskrit: , IAST: , also spelled "Damodara" and "Damodarah")  is the 367th name of Vishnu from the Vishnu Sahasranama. The various meanings of the name are given as follows:

"The Lord when He was tied with a cord (dāma) around His waist (udara)", denoting a divine pastime in which Krishna's mother Yashoda bound him for being mischievous.  (Used by various Vaishnava adherents.)
"One who is known through a mind which is purified (Udara) by means of self-control (dama)".
"One in whose bosom rests the entire universe."

In popular culture
A popular bhajan that celebrates Krishna as Damodara is the Damodarashtakam (found in the Padma Purana of Krishna Dwaipayana Vyasa, spoken by Satyavrata Muni in a conversation with Narada and Shaunaka.). It is often sung by devotees during the month of Kartika, and is very popular amongst the Vaishnavas of ISKCON.

References

External links
 Damodharastakam
 Sri Damodarastaka lyrics and RealAudio recording

Titles and names of Krishna
Forms of Vishnu